Coorumbene is a rural locality in the Central Highlands Region, Queensland, Australia.

Road infrastructure
The Dawson Highway follows part of the south-eastern boundary before running through to the west.

References 

Central Highlands Region
Localities in Queensland